Associazione Sportiva Dilettantistica Verucchio is an Italian association football club located in Verucchio, Emilia-Romagna. It currently plays in Promozione. Its colors are pink and black.

External links
Verucchio page at Serie-D.com

Football clubs in Italy
Football clubs in Emilia-Romagna
Association football clubs established in 1957
1957 establishments in Italy